Queen G is the fifth EP by Hong Kong singer G.E.M., released on December 28, 2018 by Hummingbird Music. "Queen G" is the third EP of G.E.M.'s 2018 project of G.E.M.’s "Fairytale Trilogy," where each of the three E.P.’s will feature three new songs written by the singer herself.

Track listing

Charts

References

2018 EPs
G.E.M. albums
Mandopop EPs